Benny Ramos is an American musician and producer from Chicago. He is currently the bassist for King James, the Rex Carroll Band, The Royal Guard, and for Whitecross, which he joined in 2000 for their reunion concert at the Cornerstone Festival and has since toured with internationally.

He is credited on at least 70 projects across genres such as R&B, funk, jazz, rock and hip hop. He's worked with artists such Israel Houghton and New Breed, Grammy Award winning producer Aaron Lindsay, Teddy Campbell, Cornell Thigpen, Michael Manson, and Bill Dickens. 

In 2010, Ramos was one of many musicians on Mister Bolin's Late Night Revival, which features previously unreleased songs written by guitarist Tommy Bolin, who died in 1976. Some of the proceeds from this album were donated to the Jackson Recovery Centers.

References 

Living people
American heavy metal bass guitarists
American male bass guitarists
American heavy metal singers
American performers of Christian music
Date of birth missing (living people)
Place of birth missing (living people)
Year of birth missing (living people)